Carodista wilpattuae is a moth in the family Lecithoceridae. It is found in Sri Lanka.

The wingspan is about 13.5 mm. The forewing pattern is similar to Carodista tribrachia, but with a large yellowish-orange patch near three-fourths and a discal spot in the middle, as well as a large yellowish-orange patch at the end of the cell, speckled with golden yellow scales. There is a short blackish streak below the discal spot.

Etymology
The species name refers to the type location.

References

Moths described in 2001
Carodista
Moths of Sri Lanka